Gazi Group Cricketers are a team that plays List A cricket in the Dhaka Premier League. They are sponsored by the Gazi Group of industrial companies. Under their former name of Magnum Cricketers they won the Dhaka First Division League in 2014–15, and were promoted to List A status in the Dhaka Premier League for 2015–16. They won the 2016–17 edition of the competition.

List A record
 2015–16: 11 matches, won 5, finished eighth
 2016–17: 16 matches, won 12, champions
 2017–18: 16 matches, won 7, finished sixth
 2018–19: 11 matches, won 5, finished eighth
 2021–22: 15 matches, won 6, finished sixth
Alok Kapali captained the team in 2015–16, Nasir Hossain in 2016–17, Jahurul Islam in 2017–18 and Imrul Kayes in 2018–19.

Current squad
Players with international caps are listed in bold

Records
Gazi Group Cricketers' highest score is 152 by Mominul Haque in 2016–17, and the best bowling figures are 8 for 40 (the competition record) by Yeasin Arafat in 2017–18.

References

External links
 Gazi Group Cricketers at CricketArchive

Dhaka Premier Division Cricket League teams